Queen's Diamond Jubilee may refer to:

 Diamond Jubilee of Queen Victoria in 1897
 Diamond Jubilee of Elizabeth II in 2012